Esentepe may refer to the following places:

اسنتىب

Turkey
 Esentepe, Adıyaman
 Esentepe, Alanya
 Esentepe, Çine
 Esentepe, Cumayeri
 Esentepe, Dikili
 Esentepe, Düzce
 Esentepe, Kayapınar
 Esentepe, Koçarlı
 Esentepe, Merzifon
 Esentepe, Nazilli
 Esentepe, Ortaköy
 Esentepe, Vezirköprü